The Pontfadog Oak was a sessile oak tree (Quercus petraea) that stood on Cilcochwyn farm above the village of Pontfadog, in the Ceiriog Valley west of Chirk in the county borough of Wrexham, Wales, until it was blown over in the early hours of 18 April 2013. At the time it was reputed to be the oldest and largest oak tree in the United Kingdom.

In 1996 using Forestry Commission techniques, its age was estimated as between 1,181 and 1,628 years.

Recognition 
The oak was one of 50 Great British Trees selected by The Tree Council in 2002 to spotlight trees in Great Britain in honour of the Queen's Golden Jubilee, "in recognition of its place in the national heritage". It was one of just 74 trees described in the 2012 book Heritage Trees Wales, published in association with The Tree Council and with support from the Countryside Council for Wales and Forestry Commission Wales.

See also
 List of Great British Trees

Notes

References 

Individual oak trees
Wrexham County Borough
Individual trees in Wales
2010s individual tree deaths